William Patterson (1790August 17, 1868) was a United States representative from Ohio.

Patterson was born in Maryland, and moved to Mansfield, Ohio where he completed preparatory studies and studied law.
Patterson was a soldier in the War of 1812
He was admitted to the bar and practiced, and held several local offices. He was an associate judge of the Court of Common Pleas in 1820 and 1827, and was elected as a Jacksonian Democrat to the Twenty-third and Twenty-fourth Congresses, holding office from March 4, 1833 to March 3, 1837.

Patterson spent the later years of his life in Van Wert County with his children.
Patterson died in Van Wert, Ohio in 1868, and was interred at Mansfield Cemetery, Mansfield.

References

External links
 

People from Maryland
Ohio state court judges
Politicians from Mansfield, Ohio
1790 births
1868 deaths
American military personnel of the War of 1812
Jacksonian members of the United States House of Representatives from Ohio
19th-century American politicians